Verbatim means word for word.

Verbatim may also refer to:
 Verbatim (brand), a brand of storage media and flash memory
 Verbatim (horse), an American racehorse
 Verbatim (magazine), edited by Erin McKean
 Verbatim theatre, a form of documentary theatre